Brusy-Jaglie  is a village in the administrative district of Gmina Brusy, within Chojnice County, Pomeranian Voivodeship, in northern Poland. Here was born Józef Chełmowski - a Kashubian folk-sculptor.

For details of the history of the region, see History of Pomerania.

The village has a population of 159.

References

Brusy-Jaglie